Nathan Ransom Leonard (November 29, 1832 – July 8, 1917) was an acting president of the University of Iowa, serving first from 1867 to 1868 and again from 1870 to 1871.

Presidents of the University of Iowa
1832 births
1917 deaths